The Mute of Portici is a 1952 Italian historical melodrama film directed by Giorgio Ansoldi. It is based on a play by Eugène Scribe.

Cast
 Flora Mariel as Lucia Maniello
 Doris Duranti as Elvira D'Herrera
 Paolo Carlini as Masaniello
 Ottavio Senoret as Alfonso
 Umberto Sacripante as La Spia
 Raf Pindi as Viceroy of Naples
 Paolo Dola as Cap. Perrone
 Maurizio Di Nardo
 Isarco Ravaioli
 Anna Maria Ferrero (uncredited)
 Marcello Mastroianni (uncredited)
 Jacques Sernas (uncredited)

See also
La muette de Portici (play)
The Dumb Girl of Portici (1916)
The Mute of Portici (1922)

References

Bibliography 
 Chiti, Roberto & Poppi, Roberto. Dizionario del cinema italiano: Dal 1945 al 1959. Gremese Editore, 1991.

External links

1952 films
1952 drama films
1950s historical drama films
1950s Italian-language films
Italian black-and-white films
Films based on operas
Films based on works by Eugène Scribe
Films set in the 1640s
Films set in Naples
Italian historical drama films
Melodrama films
1950s Italian films